The Crayon Box is an American children's TV series that was aired in syndication from 1997 to 1998, based on a poem by Shane DeRolf. The show followed Bananas in Pajamas as part of a 30-minute double-show, with each show being 15 minutes. The show's tagline was "A Good Show Helping to Build Great Kids". There were many characters beside the crayon characters, that were both live-action puppets, and cartoon.

The series was produced by Chiodo Bros. Productions, Sunbow Entertainment, Random House and PolyGram Television and its double-program was produced by Sachs Family Entertainment.

In Canada, it was shown on YTV.

Characters
The Crayons - a box of multi-coloured crayons, who introduce each episode's story then moralise at the end.
Bubby - a brown bear, sensible and level-headed.
Dotty - a young cat with dots, Dotty is clever and excitable but prone to selfishness.
Lump - a purple dog, quite slow-witted but friendly and eager to please.
Jack - a cheeky Jack in the Box.
Piggy Banks - a piggy bank, very pink and sweet.
The Baby - a bonnet-clad baby who is wise beyond her years.
The Sheriff - a Wild-West Sheriff, authoritarian and clumsy, often losing his hat.
Hugo - the Sheriff's horse, an intelligent hobby horse with an English accent who is quick to help the Sheriff whenever he gets in a muddle.
The Cutout Sisters - Paperchain dolls who always sing to communicate.

Adaptations
A book known as The Crayon Box that Talked was published on October 21, 1997 by Random House, written by Shane DeRolf, and illustrated by Michael Letzig.

References

External links

KPTV schedule from 1997, featuring Bananas in Pajamas and The Crayon Box in the grid

1990s American children's television series
1997 American television series debuts
1998 American television series endings
American television series with live action and animation
American television shows featuring puppetry
Television series by Sunbow Entertainment
Television series by Universal Television
Television series by Sony Pictures Television
Sentient toys in fiction